Satkhira Govt. Polytechnic Institute is a modern polytechnic institute in Bangladesh. It is the only government mid-level engineering institution in Satkhira. Fully and legally established in 2002.
Satkhira Govt. Polytechnic Institute operates under the executive control of the Ministry of Education. Acting through the Directorate of Technical Education. The academic programs, function under the regulation of the Bangladesh Technical Education Board, Dhaka.

Satkhira Polytechnic Institute is one of the most renowned technical institutions of Bangladesh. It is located next to the Satkhira Jessore Road in Labsha Union Parishad. It has a large campus having one academic building, one administration building, and two workshop buildings. At present, more than 1000 students are involved in this institute.

Established in 2006, the Bangladesh Technical Education Board (BTEB) offers courses in 4-year Diploma-In-Engineering in four technologies.
In the world-famous mangrove forest, Sundorbone touched district Satkhira, Satkhira Polytechnic Institute (SPI), established in 2002, is the only govt. Polytechnic Institute of Satkhira District. It is also one of the most dynamic institutes in the country, emphasizing to recover the demand of mid-level technical manpower home and abroad. The institute offers diploma in engineering education with 6 technologies, namely Computer, Electronics, Refrigeration & Air-Conditioning, and Civil technologies.

At present, a total number of about 1500 students instructed by 35 teachers are receiving education for facing the global demands. 
Facing the south, the campus of SPI stands beside the Jessore-Satkhira Highway on the body of Labsha, about 5  km away from the city center in the midst of vast greenery over an area of 2.05 acres land.
SPI operates its activities according to the instructions and guidelines of Directorate of Technical Education (DTE) of the Ministry of Education, Government of the People Republic of Bangladesh. Its academic activities are run under the rules and regulations of the Bangladesh Technical Education Board (BTEB). This institute also introduced the English Language Club, a cultural club for the development of body, mind, and emotion. SPI is always committed or motivated to take a leadership role in turning our country to a mid-level one through producing the qualitative diploma graduates.

References
 http://www.satkhirapoly.gov.bd/

Polytechnic institutes in Khulna Division
Educational institutions established in 2002
2002 establishments in Bangladesh